Schoenfield is a surname and may refer to:

 Dana Schoenfield (born 1953), American olympic swimmer
 Howard Schoenfield (1957–2020), American tennis player
 Paul Schoenfield, American classical composer

See also
 Schoen Field, at Fort Harrison in Indiana, U.S.
 Schonfeld (disambiguation)